MacWilliams and MacWilliam are English-language surnames. They are derived from the Gaelic Mac Uilleim, a patronymic form of a Gaelicized form of the English William. The final -s in MacWilliams is a redundant English patronymical suffix.

Dave MacWilliams, soccer player
Jessie MacWilliams, mathematician
Keenan MacWilliam, actress
Lyle MacWilliam, Canadian congressman
Mike MacWilliam, ice hockey player

References